Jack O'Brien Dash (23 February 1907 – 8 June 1989) was a British communist and trade union leader, famous for his role in London dock strikes.

Born in Southwark to a family which was often in poverty, Dash grew up on Rockingham Street. His father Thomas was a scene shifter at the theatre where he met Dash's mother, Rose Gertrude John, who appeared on stage there. She died aged 40 of tuberculosis, when Dash was seven, followed a few years later by his father.

Dash left school at 14 to work as a page boy at a Lyons Corner House. He later became a hod carrier for a bricklayer, and worked in other jobs for short periods in between which he was unemployed. He enlisted in the Royal Army Service Corps and served for two years; he also became a professional boxer, fighting about a dozen bouts.

Dash joined the Communist Party of Great Britain in 1936 and also joined its front organisation, the National Unemployed Workers' Movement. After the outbreak of the Second World War in 1939 he joined the Auxiliary Fire Service while waiting to join the Royal Navy, although eventually he remained in the AFS (later the National Fire Service) for the rest of the war. In 1945, he found a long-term job as a docker and a member of the Transport and General Workers Union and the National Dock Labour Board. Dash prided himself on having been involved in every London dock strike from 1945 to 1969, stating that all but one had been worthwhile; the exception was an inter-union dispute. He was regarded by some as a firebrand and an agitator and was vilified as a bogeyman by the conservative media in the same manner as Derek Robinson and Arthur Scargill would later be. Dash, who was interested in poetry and would quote Samuel Butler or Robert Browning in his speeches, was often invited to address prestigious bodies: he spoke at 40 student meetings, and opposed the motion 'This House would outlaw unofficial strikes' at the Oxford Union debating society.

Jack Dash was the outstanding rank and file leader of his generation in the London. While he enjoyed undoubted success in improving conditions for workers - between 1959 and 1972 the wages of dockers trebled - repeated industrial action in the 1960s and 1970s contributed to the total decline of London's docks by 1980.

After a life-time of activism, Jack retired to become an official London tourist guide and devote more time to his other hobbies of writing and painting. In retirement, Dash became an advocate for pensioners' rights. He was commemorated by the naming of "Jack Dash House", a municipal office building on the Isle of Dogs. Built by the London Borough of Tower Hamlets in 1990 to honour the London dockers' Communist leader, it houses local council offices and the Jack Dash Gallery which holds regular exhibitions of contemporary art from Britain and around the world.

Jack Dash died in London in 1989 at the age of 82. His autobiography Good Morning Brothers!, published in 1969, was a testimony to his work as a militant trade unionist and his lifelong membership of the Communist Party. In it he said that the only epitaph he wanted was: "Here lies Jack Dash / All he wanted was / To separate them from their cash".

References

External links
 Jack Dash, British Communist, 82 - The New York Times obituary
 Jack Dash photo - www.portcities.org.uk
 Jack Dash House - www.towerhamlets.gov.uk

Communist Party of Great Britain members
English trade unionists
People from Elephant and Castle
1907 births
1989 deaths
British firefighters
English people of Welsh descent
Royal Army Service Corps soldiers
English communists
Auxiliary firefighters
Civil Defence Service personnel
20th-century British Army personnel